Loro Piana is an Italian company specialized in clothing and textile products. It is considered the largest cashmere manufacturer and the world's leading artisan company processing luxury fibers.

The company has three divisions, namely the textile division – producing high quality textiles using noble fibers such as  cashmere and baby cashmere, vicuña wool, linen, and the merino wool - the fashion luxury goods division – producing and distributing menswear, womenswear, shoes and accessories -, and the interior division – producing and distributing interior products.

History

Originally from Trivero, the Loro Piana family started as merchants of wool at the beginning of the 19th century. In the second half of this century, the family moved its activity to Valsesia and founded the wool spinning mill Fratelli Lora e Compagnia, followed by the wool spinning mill Zignone & C. in Quarona at the beginning of the 20th century.  

In 1924, the engineer Pietro Loro Piana founded the company Loro Piana & C. in Quarona.  

After taking the lead of the company in the 1960’s, Franco Loro Piana, grandson of Pietro, started to export high quality fabrics in Europe, America and Japan.

In the 1970s, the company was directed by Francos’ sons, Sergio and Pier Luigi, whose focus was on top quality fabrics development, including cashmere and extra fine wools. Sergio and Pier research gave birth to the Tasmanian fabric.  

In the 1980s, Sergio and Pier Luigi Loro Piana started to diversify the business, therefore launching their first ready to wear collection and creating the luxury good division. The interior division was then launched in 2006.

In 2013, LVMH Group acquired an 80% stake in Loro Piana, becoming the major shareholder. Sergio Loro Piana died the same year. In 2017, LVMH acquired another 5% stake in the company.

In November 2021, Damien Bertrand was appointed as CEO of the brand.  

Since 2022, Loro Piana has established its headquarters at Cortile della Seta in Milan's Brera district.

Stores

As of July 2022, Loro Piana distributes its products in Europe, North America, the Middle East, China, South Korea, and Japan. It has a total of 136 that are directly operated.

Operations
Loro Piana is vertically integrated, and it handles all stages of production according to exacting standards, from the harvesting of natural fibers to the delivery of the finished product to stores.

In 2012, turnover reached €700 million and net income represented 20% of sales. In December 2013, LVMH announced that Antoine Arnault would become chairman of Loro Piana. The company reached the 1 billion euro sales mark in 2019.

See also
 Ermenegildo Zegna
 Vitale Barberis Canonico
 Holland & Sherry
 Dormeuil
 Brunello Cucinelli

References

External links
 
 Fashionwelike.com – Interview with Sergio and Pier Luigi Loro Piana

 
Italian companies established in 1924
Clothing brands of Italy
Clothing companies of Italy
Clothing companies established in 1924
Companies based in Piedmont
Fashion accessory brands
High fashion brands
Luxury brands
Textile industry in Italy